Nickel Plate Road No. 763 is a class "S-2" 2-8-4 "Berkshire" type steam locomotive. It  was built in August 1944 by the Lima Locomotive Works in Lima, Ohio, as the ninth engine of its class. It is a high powered fast freight locomotive that carried perishables between Chicago and Buffalo, New York.

History

Revenue service
The engine was built in August 1944 by the Lima Locomotive Works. Nickel Plate 763's career consisted of pulling fast freights of perishables between Chicago and Buffalo. Pulling trains at up to 70 MPH, these engines quickly gained a reputation as high-speed brutes on the track. In 1958, due to lowering part supplies and the demand for more cheap and efficient motive power, the Nickel Plate removed all of its S-2's from service and sat dormant. The sister engine of 763, 765 was recommissioned to provide steam heat to a streamlined passenger train, and was the last Berkshire under steam for the Nickel Plate.

Retirement
Number 763 was ultimately retired in June 1958, and sat for nearly 2 years with the label of "stored serviceable" until 1960, when most of the Berkshires on the Nickel Plate were sent to scrap yards. Six berks were preserved, including 763. The 763 was put in a museum until in 1966, when the Norfolk & Western, NKP's new owner moved her to outdoor display at Wasena Park in Roanoke, Virginia.

In 1976, 763 was moved to New Jersey for a possible overhaul as it was a contending locomotive to pull the American Freedom Train. Once the engine arrived it was to be checked over and restored to working condition and double head with No. 759. However, this plan fell through and 763 was sent back to Roanoke with Southern Pacific 4449 being chosen instead.

Disposition
After the AFT fall through, NKP 763 was returned to Roanoke, where it was placed on display at the Virginia Museum of Transportation. The VMT ended up selling 763 to Jerry Jacobson, president of the Age of Steam Roundhouse and then CEO of Ohio Central Railroad for $125,000. In 2007, Jacobson returned 763 to her home state Ohio with plans to restore the it to operational condition to run on the Ohio Central. However, after the railroad was sold to the Genessee and Wyoming corporation, plans to run 763 on the Ohio Central fell through. 763 is now on static display inside the Age of Steam Roundhouse, awaiting for a possible restoration.

See also

Nickel Plate Road
NKP 759
NKP 765
NKP 779
Age of Steam Roundhouse

References

External links
 Age Of Steam Roundhouse
 Nickel Plate Road Technical and Historical Society
 Trains Magazine Article 763 Purchase
 Trains Magazine 763 On the Move
Roanoke Times: Track Change For NKP 763

2-8-4 locomotives
Nickel Plate Road locomotives
Individual locomotives of the United States
Standard gauge locomotives of the United States
Railway locomotives introduced in 1944
Lima locomotives
Preserved steam locomotives of Ohio